Macs or MACS may refer to:
a Mac computer, a nickname for the Macintosh brand
"macs" (short story), by Terry Bisson
Magellanic Catalogue of Stars, a catalogue of positions for stars covering large areas around the Large and Small Magellanic Cloud
MAssive Cluster Survey, a survey of distant galaxy clusters that are very bright in X-ray
Magnetic-activated cell sorting
Manual Ability Classification System for manual dexterity in cerebral palsy
Minimal Access Cranial Suspension, a form of facial surgery or rhytidectomy used to reduce wrinkles and lift sagging facial tissue
MACS (software), Model-based Analysis of ChIP-Seq, software for finding peaks in ChIP-Seq data used in computational biology
Multicenter AIDS Cohort Study
Mac's Convenience Stores, a chain of stores in Canada
Metropolitan Area Commuter System, a bus system in Fairbanks, Alaska
Mountain Ash Comprehensive School, in Wales

See also

Macks Creek, Missouri
Mac (disambiguation)
Max (disambiguation)
Macx (disambiguation)
Macs (disambiguation)
MAKS (disambiguation)